Ophrys × gaulosana is a species of plants in the family Orchidaceae (orchids).

References 

gaulosana
Interspecific orchid hybrids